Aspasmichthys alorensis is a species of clingfish found in the western Pacific Ocean in Indonesia. The species was described by Gerald R. Allen and Mark Erdmann in 2012 from a type collected at submerged reef in the Alor Strait, East Nusa Tenggara, Indonesia at a depth 16 meters,. It is apparently associated with sponges.

References

alorensis
Fish described in 2012